Jamour Chames (born August 29, 1989) is an American contemporary artist. His works have been exhibited internationally. He is most known for his 'Girl All Over the World' art collection, which is his body of work he dedicated to celebrating women. He lives and works in New York City.

Biography 
Jamour Chames was born in Covington, Kentucky on August 29, 1989. He graduated from Holmes High School.

Works 
Chames' signature style is minimalistic with a use of color and shapes. Jamour Chames' work explores positive imagery and he seeks to create artwork that makes a positive impact on the world. In his most recent body of work 'Girl All Over the World,' Chames celebrates women worldwide. With Girl All Over the World Chames' attempted to readjust the sexist imagery in art and shine a positive light on women in a non objectifying way. Chames has exhibited this body of work internationally.

References

External links
  The Official Website of Jamour Chames 
 ArtSlant I Jamour Chames Jamour Chames Official ArtSlant Page
 Jamour Chames: MoMA PS1 Studio Visit  MoMA PS1 Studio Visit.
 Tate UK: Girl All Over the World Album Tate Modern Online Album
  London Fashion Week Art London City: Girl All Over the World: London
  Graphics to Galleries AUC Hotspot 
  Interview with Artist Jamour Chames Nora Gouma Magazine
  New Muse in Contemporary Art Nora Gouma Magazine

1989 births
Living people
People from Covington, Kentucky
African-American contemporary artists
American contemporary artists
21st-century American painters
American contemporary painters
American male painters
African-American painters
21st-century African-American artists
20th-century African-American people